The Perpetual Altas basketball program represents University of Perpetual Help System DALTA (UPHSD) in men's basketball as a member of the National Collegiate Athletic Association (Philippines) (NCAA). The Perpetual Altas have never won the NCAA championship ever since joining in 1984.

History 
The University of Pereptual Help System DALTA has previously used the "PHCR" and "UPHR" acronyms, which stand for "Perpetual Help College of Rizal" and "University of Perpetual Help Rizal", respectively.

The Perpetual Help College of Rizal joined the NCAA in 1984. In 1989, the Altas faced defending champions San Sebastian Stags. Bannered by Most Valuable Player Eric Clement Quiday and Bong Hawkins, they took the Stags to all three games in the Finals before losing.

Now called University of Perpetual Help Rizal (UPHR), the Altas made it to the playoffs in the turn of the millennium. With the #1 seed in the second NCAA Final Four and led by Jojo Manalo, the Altas were eliminated by the JRC Heavy Bombers. In the next year, UPHR finished second in the elimination round, but fell again in the semifinals to the Benilde Blazers.

Perpetual next made it to the Finals in 2004, where they lost to the PCU Dolphins. The Altas were then coached by Bai Cristobal and bannered by Dominador Javier. Renamed as University of Perpetual Help System DALTA (UPHSD), the Altas missed the playoffs for seven years.

In 2012, the university hired Aric del Rosario, which has seen a renaissance in basketball fortunes for UPHSD. Led by Most Valuable Players Scottie Thompson and Prince Eze, and Bright Akhuetie, the Altas made it to three consecutive semifinals appearances Del Rosario left coaching Perpetual to a winning record, but just outside of the playoff places.

Now coached by Jimwell Gican, the Altas had Akhuetie as its best player and made it to the semifinals again, only to be eliminated by the Red Lions for another time. Coached by Akhuetie's former teammate Nick Omorogbe, the Altas had a losing season in 2017. At the next season, UPHSD appointed Frankie Lim as their new head coach. Lim coached the team to a semifinals appearance on his first year, but missed the playoffs on the second. He then resigned on the onset of the COVID-19 pandemic as the school shut down its athletic activities. In the 2021 bubble season held in 2022, the Altas coached by Myk Saguiguit made it to the semifinals where they were eliminated by the undefeated Letran Knights.

Current roster
NCAA Season 98

Head coaches 

 2000–2008: Bai Cristobal
 2009–2010: Boris Aldeguer
 2011: Jimwell Gican
 2012–2015: Aric del Rosario
 2016: Jimwell Gican
 2017: Nick Omorogbe
 2017: Jimwell Gican (interim)
 2018–2020: Frankie Lim
 2021–present: Myk Saguiguit

Season-by-season records

References 

National Collegiate Athletic Association (Philippines) basketball teams